AJK TV is a television channel owned by the Pakistan Television Corporation, Pakistan's state-broadcaster. Subsequent to the resolution passed by the Azad Kashmir Legislative Assembly requesting for the establishment of new channel in Azad Jammu Kashmir, Gilgit Baltistan and directive from the President of Pakistan in 2002, it was decided to establish a new TV channel in those regions by early-2004. In pursuance finally a portion of Radio Pakistan building was selected by the chairman of the PTC to serve as AJK TV.

History
The channel was launched on 5 February 2004 with its inauguration by the President of Pakistan.

References

External links
 PTV Official Website
 PTV Bolan

2004 establishments in Pakistan
Pakistan Television Corporation
Mass media in Azad Kashmir